Edward Clark (May 6, 1878 – November 18, 1954) was a Russian-born American actor whose career began in the silent era. He appeared in more than 130 films between 1913 and 1955. He was also a playwright, theatre director and  songwriter. Among his songs was the original 1899 barbershop quartet song Heart of My Heart. He was born in Russia and died in Hollywood, California from a heart attack.

Works

Selected filmography

 Graft (1915, Serial) – Grant Fisher
 The Iron Hand (1916) – Jerry Simpson
 The Bronze Bride (1917) – William Ogden
 Eternal Love (1917) – François Gautier
 The Kaiser, the Beast of Berlin (1918) – Gen. Erich von Falkenhagen
 Millionaires (1926)
 Broken Hearts of Hollywood (1926, scenario)
 Sally in Our Alley (1927, scenario)
 Finger Prints (1927, scenario)
 Hills of Kentucky (1927, scenario)
 Marriage by Contract (1928)
 Unmasked (1929, scenario)
 King Kong (1933) – Member of Ship's Crew (uncredited)
 One Hour Late (1934) – Mr. Meller
 Swamp Water (1941) – Townsman (uncredited)
 Ball of Fire (1941) – Motor Court Proprietor (uncredited)
 Roxie Hart (1942) – Idler (uncredited)
 The Male Animal (1942) – Newsdealer (uncredited)
 Mrs. Wiggs of the Cabbage Patch (1942) – Cabbage Patch Character (uncredited)
 Hello, Frisco, Hello (1943) – Sam, the Stage Doorman (uncredited)
 The Good Fellows (1943) – Cutler (uncredited)
 Phantom of the Opera (1943) – Usher (uncredited)
 Sweet Rosie O'Grady (1943) – Minor Role (uncredited)
 The Song of Bernadette (1943) – Hospital Attendant (uncredited)
 The Falcon Out West (1944) – Coroner (uncredited)
 Jungle Woman (1944) – Inquest Juror (uncredited)
 Heavenly Days (1944) – Sam, the Gallup Clerk (uncredited)
 Experiment Perilous (1944) – Train Steward (uncredited)
 Where Do We Go from Here? (1945) – Organist (uncredited)
 The Falcon's Alibi (1946) – Coroner (uncredited)
 O.S.S. (1946) – French Waiter (uncredited)
 Nocturne (1946) – Apartment House Clerk (uncredited)
 It's a Wonderful Life (1946) – Building & Loan Board Member (uncredited)
 The Fabulous Dorseys (1947) – Hotel Clerk (uncredited)
 Love and Learn (1947) - Justice of the Peace (uncredited)
 Welcome Stranger (1947) – Andy Weaver (uncredited)
 I Wonder Who's Kissing Her Now (1947) – Dad - Stage Doorman (uncredited)
 Heaven Only Knows (1947) – Storekeeper Townsman (uncredited)
 Nightmare Alley (1947) – J.E. Giles - Farmer (uncredited)
 My Wild Irish Rose (1947) – Jeremiah Mahoney - Justice of the Peace (uncredited)
 The Senator Was Indiscreet (1947) – Eddie
 If You Knew Susie (1948) – Band Leader (uncredited)
 My Girl Tisa (1948) – Bit Role (uncredited)
 April Showers (1948) – Pop - Stagedoor Man (uncredited)
 Give My Regards to Broadway (1948) – Western Union Boy (uncredited)
 The Walls of Jericho (1948) – Barber (uncredited)
 When My Baby Smiles at Me (1948) – Box-Office Clerk (uncredited)
 The Accused (1949) – Professor (uncredited)
 Amazon Quest (1949) – Nicholas Handel
 Illegal Entry (1949) – News Shop Proprietor (uncredited)
 Look for the Silver Lining (1949) – Wilkins (uncredited)
 The Great Gatsby (1949) – One of Gatsby's Servants (uncredited)
 It's a Great Feeling (1949) – Minister (uncredited)
 Abandoned (1949) – Clerk in Coroner's Office (uncredited)
 Oh, You Beautiful Doll (1949) – Cooper - Desk Clerk (uncredited)
 Free for All (1949) – Doctor (uncredited)
 Undertow (1949) – Drugstore Clerk (uncredited)
 Dancing in the Dark (1949) – Mr. Wallberg (uncredited)
 Key to the City (1950) – Elderly Passerby (uncredited)
 House by the River (1950) – Minor Role (uncredited)
 A Ticket to Tomahawk (1950) – Jet (uncredited)
 Rock Island Trail (1950) – Old Man (uncredited)
 Trial Without Jury (1950) – Eddie (uncredited)
 The Petty Girl (1950) – Prof. Ramsey (uncredited)
 Pretty Baby (1950) – Radio Actor (uncredited)
 The Milkman (1950) – Old Man (uncredited)
 Two Weeks with Love (1950) – Druggist (uncredited)
 Branded (1950) – Dad Travis
 Gambling House (1950) – Pop (uncredited)
 Sierra Passage (1950) – Old Man with Pumpkin (uncredited)
 Stage to Tucson (1950) – Denver Hotel Clerk (uncredited)
 Grounds for Marriage (1951) – Mr. Parmel (uncredited)
 Three Guys Named Mike (1951) – Old Man at Rooming House (uncredited)
 Bedtime for Bonzo (1951) – Professor Fosdick
 Danger Zone (1951) – Elderly Man at Auction (1st Episode)
 The Fat Man (1951) – Pop (uncredited)
 Ma and Pa Kettle Back on the Farm (1951) – Dr. Bagley (uncredited)
 Million Dollar Pursuit (1951) – Holcomb
 Dear Brat (1951) – Dr. Edwards (uncredited)
 Savage Drums (1951) – Tabuana, older chief on council
 Strangers on a Train (1951) – Miriam's Boss (uncredited)
 Never Trust a Gambler (1951) – Dr. Gray (uncredited)
 Mr. Belvedere Rings the Bell (1951) – Mailman (uncredited)
 Rhubarb (1951) – Judge Loudermilk (uncredited)
 Little Egypt (1951) – Judge
 Cattle Queen (1951) – Doc Hodges
 Finders Keepers (1952) – Gramps (uncredited)
 Invitation (1952) – Postman (uncredited)
 Shadow in the Sky (1952) – Larkin (uncredited)
 Here Come the Nelsons (1952) – Herb (uncredited)
 Thundering Caravans (1952) – Printer Tom
 Carrie (1952) – Tom – Ticket Agent (uncredited)
 She's Working Her Way Through College (1952) – Stage Doorman (uncredited)
 You for Me (1952) – Judge (uncredited)
 Park Row (1952) – Saloon Patron (uncredited)
 Just for You (1952) – Sam – Stage Doorman (uncredited)
 The Happy Time (1952) – Dr. Marchaud
 Million Dollar Mermaid (1952) – Manin Train Compartment (uncredited)
 The Blue Gardenia (1953) – News Stand Dealer (uncredited)
 I Love Melvin (1953) – Meek Man (uncredited)
 It Happens Every Thursday (1953) – Homer
 The Beast from 20,000 Fathoms (1953) – Lighthouse Keeper (uncredited)
 Houdini (1953) – Doorman (uncredited)
 Flame of Calcutta (1953) – Pandit Bandar
 Bandits of the West (1953) – John Anders (uncredited)
 Topeka (1953) – Banker Corley
 Champ for a Day (1953) – Cashier (uncredited)
 El Paso Stampede (1953) – Josh Bailey
 The Moonlighter (1953) – Telegrapher (uncredited)
 Easy to Love (1953) – Gardener (uncredited)
 Money from Home (1953) – Dr. Walter Capulet (uncredited)
 Three Hours to Kill (1954) – Ernest (uncredited)
 Cry Vengeance (1954) – Shop Owner (uncredited)
 Hell's Outpost (1954) – Belden (uncredited)
 Crashout (1955) – Conductor
 East of Eden (1955) – Draft Board Member (uncredited)

Musicals
Oh, What a Girl (book and lyrics)
Paradise Alley (book)
Cinders (book and lyrics) Music by Rudolf Friml
Furs and Frills (book and lyrics)
Honey Girl (book)
You're in Love (book and lyrics)
Little Miss Charity (lyrics)

Plays
Coat Tails
Not with My Money
De Luxe Annie was a starring vehicle for Emélie Polini in Australia and US, and was filmed in 1918, starring Norma Talmadge.

References

External links

Edward Clark on BroadwayWorld.com

1878 births
1954 deaths
American male film actors
American male silent film actors
American dramatists and playwrights
Emigrants from the Russian Empire to the United States
20th-century American male actors
Burials at Forest Lawn Memorial Park (Glendale)